Lorenzo Monti Azpiazu (born 2 March 1998) is an Argentine professional footballer who plays as a midfielder for Acassuso.

Career
Monti started his professional career with Acassuso. Rodolfo Della Picca promoted the midfielder into their senior set-up, with his debut arriving in a Primera B Metropolitana draw with San Miguel on 23 October 2018. He was substituted on in that fixture, as he was a further three times in 2018–19 before he received his first start in the succeeding February against Atlanta.

Personal life
Monti's brother, Rafael, is a footballer; he also played in the Acassuso youth system.

Career statistics
.

References

External links

1998 births
Living people
Place of birth missing (living people)
Argentine footballers
Association football midfielders
Primera B Metropolitana players
Club Atlético Acassuso footballers